Seeney is a surname. Notable people with the surname include:

Angela Seeney, British energy engineer
Daphne Seeney (1933–2020), Australian tennis player
Jeff Seeney (born 1957), Australian politician

See also
Deeney
Seeley (surname)